Russell Blackford (born 1954) is an Australian writer, philosopher, and literary critic.

Early life and education 
Blackford was born in Sydney, and grew up in the city of Lake Macquarie, near Newcastle, New South Wales. After graduating with first-class honours degrees in both arts and law from the University of Newcastle and University of Melbourne respectively, Blackford was awarded a PhD in English literature, also from Newcastle, on the return to myth in modern fictional narrative (as postulated by Northrop Frye). He completed a Master of Bioethics at Monash University and was awarded a second PhD, in philosophy (also from Monash), for a thesis entitled "The philosophy of human enhancement". His supervisor was Justin Oakley.

Career 
As a fiction writer, Blackford specialises in science fiction, fantasy and horror fiction. His work includes four novels published by iBooks, three of them forming an original trilogy (The New John Connor Chronicles) set in the world of the Terminator movies. His non-fiction work frequently deals with issues involving science and society, particularly philosophical bioethics, cyberculture, transhumanism, and the history and current state of the science fiction genre. His work has appeared in many magazines, journals, and reference books, and has been featured most prominently in Quadrant, a monthly journal of literature and policy. It draws on his academic qualifications in a number of fields.

Since 2008, he has also been a Fellow of the Institute for Ethics and Emerging Technologies. He was a speaker at the 2010 Global Atheist Convention and a contributor to The Australian Book of Atheism.

Bibliography

Novels
The Tempting of the Witch King, Melbourne, Cory & Collins, 1983, 
The New John Connor Chronicles:
Dark Futures: Book One of Terminator 2: The New John Connor Chronicles, iBooks, August 2002, 336p, 
An Evil Hour: Book Two of Terminator 2: The New John Connor Chronicles, iBooks, May 2003, 368p, 
Times of Trouble: Book Three of Terminator 2: The New John Connor Chronicles, iBooks, September 2003, 384p, 
Kong Reborn, ibooks, Inc. November 2005, 320p,

Non-fiction books
Hyperdreams: Damien Broderick's Space/Time Fiction, Originally published in 1998 as chapbook 8 in the Babel Handbooks series on Fantasy and Science Fiction Writers.  Review of the writings of SF author Damien Broderick.
Strange Constellations: A History of Australian Science Fiction (with Van Ikin and Sean McMullen), Greenwood Press, Contributions to the Study of Science Fiction and Fantasy, May 1999, 264p, 
Reviewed in: *"Science Fiction in Australia", by Michael Levy (Science Fiction Studies 27:1 (March,2000) "Russell Blackford ... among Australia's most widely respected critics"
Freedom of Religion and the Secular State, Wiley-Blackwell, 2012.  
50 Great Myths About Atheism (with Udo Schuklenk), Wiley-Blackwell, 2013. .
Humanity Enhanced: Genetic Choice and the Challenge for Liberal Democracies, MIT Press, 2014. .
The Mystery of Moral Authority, Palgrave Pivot, 2016. .
Science Fiction and the Moral Imagination: Visions, Minds, Ethics, Springer, 2017. .
The Tyranny of Opinion: Conformity and the Future of Liberalism, Bloomsbury, 2018 .

Editor
Urban Fantasies, anthology of 13 stories, edited with David King, Ebony, 1985.  
Contrary Modes, proceedings of the academic track of Aussiecon 2, edited with Jenny Blackford, Lucy Sussex and Norman Talbot, 1985.  
50 Voices of Disbelief: Why We Are Atheists, co-editor with Udo Schuklenk, 2009.  
Intelligence Unbound: The Future of Uploaded and Machine Minds, co-editor with Damien Broderick, 2014. 
 Philosophy's Future: The Problem of Philosophical Progress, co-editor with Damien Broderick, 2017.

Academic articles
"Judicial Power, Political Liberty and the Post-Industrial State." Australian Law Journal 71 (1997): 267–93.
"Thinking about Cloning: A Reply to Judith Thomson." Journal of Law and Medicine 9 (2001): 238–50.
"Stranger Than You Think: Arthur C. Clarke's Profiles of the Future." Prefiguring Cyberculture: An Intellectual History. Ed. Darren Tofts, Annemarie Jonson, and Alessio Cavellaro. Sydney: Power Publications, 2002; co-published Boston: MIT Press, 2003: 252–63.
"Try the Blue Pill: What's Wrong with Life in a Simulation?" Jacking In to the Matrix Franchise: Cultural Reception and Interpretation. Ed. Matthew Kapell and William Doty. New York: Continuum, 2004: 169–82.
"Should We Fear Death? Epicurean and Modern Arguments." Immortality Institute, ed. The Scientific Conquest of Death: Essays on Infinite Lifespans. Buenos Aires: LibrosEnRed, 2004: 257–69.
"Human Cloning and 'Posthuman' Society." Monash Bioethics Review 24 (2005): 10–26.
"Stem cell research on other worlds, or why embryos do not have a right to life." Journal of Medical Ethics 32 (2006): 177–80.

Short stories
"The Load on Her Mind", Westerly Volume 27, (1982).  
"Crystal Soldier" (1983) in Dreamworks: Strange New Stories (ed. David King) 
"Glass Reptile Breakout" (1985) in Strange attractors: Original Australian speculative fiction (ed. Hale and Iremonger)  
"The Sword of God" (1996) in Dream Weavers (ed. Paul Collins)
"Lucent Carbon" (1997) in Eidolon (Australian magazine), #25/26
"The Soldier in the Machine" (1998) in Dreaming Down-Under (ed. Jack Dann, Janeen Webb)
"Byzantium vs Republic of Australia" (1998) in Aurealis #20/21
"The King with Three Daughters" (2000) in Black Heart, Ivory Bones (ed. Ellen Datlow, Terri Windling) 
"Two Thousand Years" (2000) in Eidolon (Australian magazine) #29/30
"Smoke City" (2003) in Gathering the Bones (ed. Ramsey Campbell, Jack Dann, Dennis Etchison) 
"The Name of the Beast Was Number" (2004) in Microcosms (ed. Gregory Benford) 
"Idol" (2004) in Oceans of the Mind XII - reprinted (2014) in Novascapes (ed. C.E. Page)
"Manannan's Children" (2008) in Dreaming Again: Thirty-five New Stories Celebrating the Wild Side of Australian Fiction (ed. Jack Dann)

References
 David Seed. A Companion To Science Fiction Malden, MA: Blackwell Publishing, 2005.

Footnotes

External links
 

 Blackford's blog

Living people
Australian atheists
Australian science fiction writers
Australian speculative fiction critics
Writers from Melbourne
People from Newcastle, New South Wales
Writers from Sydney
Science fiction critics
Bioethicists
University of Newcastle (Australia) alumni
Melbourne Law School alumni
Monash University alumni
21st-century Australian philosophers
20th-century Australian philosophers
Australian transhumanists
1954 births
Australian male novelists